The Royal Canadian Mounted Police (RCMP;), commonly known in English as the Mounties (and colloquially in French as ) is the federal and national police service of Canada. As police services are the constitutional responsibility of provinces and territories of Canada, the RCMP's primary responsibility is the enforcement of federal criminal law, and sworn members of the RCMP have jurisdiction as a peace officer in all provinces and territories of Canada. However, the service also provides police services under contract to eight of Canada's provinces (all except Ontario and Quebec), all three of Canada's territories, more than 150 municipalities, and 600 Indigenous communities. In addition to enforcing federal legislation and delivering local police services under contract, the RCMP is responsible for border integrity; overseeing Canadian peacekeeping missions involving police; managing the Canadian Firearms Program, which licenses and registers firearms and their owners; and the Canadian Police College, which provides police training to Canadian and international police services.

The Royal Canadian Mounted Police was established in 1920 with the amalgamation of the Royal North-West Mounted Police and the Dominion Police. The RCMP has long enjoyed an international cultural influence, appearing in films, television shows, and books since its formation in the early 20th century. The Government of Canada considers the RCMP to be an unofficial national symbol, and in 2013, 87 per cent of Canadians interviewed by Statistics Canada said that the RCMP was important to their national identity. However, the service has faced criticism for its broad mandate, and its public perception in Canada has gradually soured since the 1990s, worn down by workplace culture lawsuits, several high-profile scandals, staffing shortages, and the service's handling of incidents like the 2020 Nova Scotia attacks.

The two most populous provinces, Ontario and Quebec, operate independent provincial police services, which, like the RCMP, are responsible for some provincial law enforcement and providing local police services under contract. The other eight provinces and all three territories contract at least some policing responsibilities to the RCMP, which provides front-line policing in those provinces under the direction of the provincial governments. Municipalities, which are responsible for police services in every province except Newfoundland and Labrador, can contract for RCMP services through their provincial government, or by direct contracts. Thus, the RCMP provides police services at the federal, provincial, and municipal level. In some areas of Canada, it is the only police service.

History

Early history (1920–1970) 

The Royal Canadian Mounted Police was formed in 1920 by the amalgamation of two separate federal police services: the Royal North-West Mounted Police (RNWMP), which had been responsible for colonial policing in the Canadian West, but by 1920 was becoming "rapidly obsolete;" and the Dominion Police, which was responsible for federal law enforcement, intelligence, and parliamentary security. The new police service inherited the paramilitary, frontline policing-oriented culture that had governed the RNWMP, which had been modelled after the Royal Irish Constabulary, but much of the RCMP's local policing role had been superseded by provincial and municipal police services.

In 1928, the federal government authorized the RCMP to enter into heavily-subsidized contracts with provinces and municipalities, enabling the services to return to its roots in local policing. The federal government paid 60 per cent of the policing costs, while provinces and municipalities paid the remaining 40 per cent. By 1950, eight of the ten Canadian provinces had disbanded their provincial police services in favour of subsidized RCMP policing.

As part of its national security and intelligence functions, the RCMP infiltrated ethnic or political groups considered to be dangerous to Canada. These included the Communist Party of Canada (founded in 1921) and a variety of Indigenous, minority cultural, and nationalist groups. The service was also deeply involved in immigration matters, and was responsible for deporting suspected radicals. The RCMP paid particular attention to nationalist and socialist Ukrainian groups and the Chinese community, which was targeted because of disproportionate links to opium dens. Historians estimate that Canada deported two percent of its Chinese community between 1923 and 1932, largely under the provisions of the Opium and Narcotics Drugs Act.

In 1932, RCMP members killed Albert Johnson, the Mad Trapper of Rat River, after a shoot-out. Johnson had been the subject of a dispute with local Indigenous trappers — he had reportedly destroyed their traps, harassed them verbally, and on one occasion, pointed a firearm at them — and, when confronted with a search warrant, opened fire on RCMP officers, wounding one. Also in 1932, the Customs Preventive Service (CPS), a branch of the Department of National Revenue, was folded into the RCMP at the request of RCMP leadership.

In 1935, the RCMP, acting as the provincial police service for Saskatchewan (but against the wishes of the Saskatchewan government) and in collaboration with the Regina Police Service, attempted to arrest organizers of the On-to-Ottawa Trek in the Germantown neighbourhood's market square by kettling around 300 rally-goers, sparking the Regina Riot. One city police officer and one protester were killed. The trek, which had been organized to call attention to conditions in relief camps, consequently failed to reach Ottawa, but nevertheless had political reverberations. That same year, three RCMP members, acting under contract as provincial police officers, were killed in Saskatchewan and Alberta during an arrest and subsequent pursuit.

During the interwar period, the RCMP employed special constables to assist with strikebreaking. For a brief period in the late 1930s, a volunteer militia group, the Legion of Frontiersmen, were affiliated with the RCMP. Many members of the RCMP belonged to this organization, which was prepared to serve as an auxiliary police service.

In 1940, the RCMP schooner St. Roch facilitated the first effective patrol of Canada's Arctic territory. It was the first vessel to navigate the Northwest Passage from west to east, taking two years, the first to navigate the passage in one season (from Halifax to Vancouver in 1944), the first to sail either way through the passage in one season, and the first to circumnavigate North America (1950).

In 1941, two African-Canadian men from Nova Scotia applied to join the RCMP. The commissioner at the time, Stuart Wood, allegedly allowed them to sit for entrance tests in the hopes that they could be definitively refused entry to the service as "their colour would raise the question of policy." Both men ultimately passed the requisite tests, but neither was given an offer of employment.

In the wake of the 1945 defection of Soviet cipher clerk Igor Gouzenko, who revealed that the Soviet Union was spying on Western nations, the RCMP separated its units responsible for domestic intelligence and counter-espionage from the Criminal Investigation Branch to the new Special Branch, formed in 1950. The branch changed names twice: in 1962, to the Directorate of Security and Intelligence; and in 1970 to the Security Service.

On April 1, 1949, Newfoundland and Labrador joined in full confederation with Canada and the Newfoundland Ranger Force amalgamated with the RCMP.

In June 1953, the RCMP became a full member of the International Criminal Police Organization (Interpol).

In 1969, the RCMP hired its first Black police officer, Hartley Gosline.

Late 20th century 
On July 4, 1973, during a visit to Regina, Saskatchewan, Queen Elizabeth II approved a new badge for the RCMP. The force subsequently presented the sovereign with a tapestry rendering of the new design.

In 1978, the RCMP formed 31 part-time Emergency Response Teams across the country to respond to serious incidents requiring a tactical police response.

In 1986, in the wake of the 1985 Turkish embassy attack in Ottawa and the bombing of Air India Flight 182, the Canadian government directed the RCMP to form the Special Emergency Response Team (SERT), a full-time counter-terrorism unit.

In the early 1990s, journalists at the Canadian Broadcasting Company's The Fifth Estate opened an investigation into rumours that a senior RCMP officer in the Criminal Intelligence Service (CISC) was on the payroll of a Montreal-based organized crime group, and in 1992, aired an episode identifying Inspector Claude Savoie, then the assistant director of the CISC, as the leak, citing evidence that connected him to Allan Ronald Ross, an Irish-Canadian drug lord, and Sidney Leithman, a prominent lawyer associated with Montreal's organized crime network. Shortly after the episode aired, and minutes before being interviewed by detectives with the RCMP's professional standards unit, Savoie committed suicide in his Ottawa office. One of Savoie's subordinates, Portuguese-Canadian Constable Jorge Leite, was found guilty of corruption and breach of trust by a Portuguese court in relation to his work with Savoie.

In 1993, the Special Emergency Response Team (SERT), were transferred to the Canadian Forces (CF), creating a new unit called Joint Task Force 2 (JTF2). The JTF2 inherited some equipment and the SERT's former training base near Ottawa.

In 1995 the Personal Protection Group (PPG) of the RCMP was created at the behest of Jean Chretien after the break-in by André Dallaire at the Prime Minister's official Ottawa residence, 24 Sussex Drive. The PPG is a 180-member group responsible for VIP security details, chiefly the prime minister and the governor general.

RCMP Security Service (1950–1984) 

The RCMP Security Service (RCMPSS) was a specialized political intelligence and counterintelligence branch with national security responsibilities following revelations of illegal covert operations relating to the Quebec separatist movement. As a result, the RCMPSS was replaced by the Canadian Security Intelligence Service (CSIS) in 1984, and is statutorily independent of the RCMP.

In the late 1970s, revelations surfaced that the RCMP Security Service service had in the course of their intelligence duties engaged in crimes such as burning a barn and stealing documents from the separatist Parti Québécois. This led to the Royal Commission of Inquiry into Certain Activities of the RCMP, better known as the "McDonald Commission", named for the presiding judge, Justice David Cargill McDonald. The commission recommended that the service's intelligence duties be removed in favour of the creation of a separate intelligence agency, the CSIS. The RCMP and the CSIS nonetheless continue to share responsibility for some law enforcement activities in the contemporary era, particularly in the anti-terrorism context.

21st century
The RCMP Sky Marshals, which is charged with security on passenger aircraft, was inaugurated in 2002 because of 9/11.

Four RCMP officers were fatally shot during the Mayerthorpe tragedy in Alberta in March 2005. It was the single worst multiple killing of RCMP officers since the killing of 3 officers in Kamloops British Columbia by a mentally ill assailant in June 1962. Prior to that the RCMP had not felt such a loss since the North-West Rebellion. One result was that on 21 October 2011 then-Commissioner William J. S. Elliott announced that RCMP officers would have the C8 rifle at their disposition, where in the past they had been limited to sidearms. One of the main conclusions from the Fatality Inquiry that led to this result was the fact that the officers who were involved in the events did not have the appropriate weapon to face someone with a semi-automatic rifle.

In 2006, the United States Coast Guard's Ninth District and the RCMP began a program called "Shiprider", in which 12 Mounties from the RCMP detachment at Windsor and 16 US Coast Guard boarding officers from stations in Michigan ride in each other's vessels. The intent was to allow for seamless enforcement of the international border.

On December 6, 2006, RCMP Commissioner Giuliano Zaccardelli resigned after admitting that his earlier testimony about the Maher Arar terrorist case was inaccurate. The RCMP's actions were scrutinized by the Commission of Inquiry into the Actions of Canadian Officials in Relation to Maher Arar. In the aftermath of the Arar affair, the commission of inquiry recommended that the RCMP be subject to greater oversight from a review board with investigative and information-sharing capacities. Following the commission of inquiry's recommendations, the Harper government tabled amendments to the RCMP Act to create the Civilian Review and Complaints Commission.

In the wake of the 2007 Robert Dziekański taser incident at the Vancouver International Airport, two officers were found guilty of perjury to the Braidwood Inquiry and sentenced to jail for their actions. They appealed all the way to the Supreme Court of Canada but were unsuccessful. In July 2007, two RCMP officers were shot and succumbed to their injuries in the Spiritwood Incident near Mildred, Saskatchewan. By the end of 2007, the RCMP was named Newsmaker of the Year (but not in a good way) by The Canadian Press.

2010s
The RCMP mounted the Queen's Life Guard in May 2012 during celebrations of Queen Elizabeth II's Diamond Jubilee,

On 3 June 2013, the RCMP renamed its 'A' Division to National Division and tasked it with handling corruption cases "at home and abroad".

In June 2014, three RCMP officers were murdered during the Moncton shooting. A review from retired assistant commissioner Alphonse MacNeil in May 2015 issued 64 recommendations, while the RCMP was charged with violating the Canada Labour Code (CLC) for the abysmally slow roll-out of the C8 carbine, which had been recommended by the 2011 Elliott inquiry. The RCMP issued the first carbines in 2013, and with 12,000 members across the country had as of May 2015 only purchased 2,200. At the CLC trial the Crown argued that the then newly-retired head of the RCMP Bob Paulson had "played the odds" with officer safety and it proved fatal. One result of the CLC trial was the conviction of the organization that had been led by Paulson for close to seven years.

In October 2016, the RCMP issued an apology for harassment, discrimination, and sexual abuse of female officers and civilian members. Additionally they set aside a $100 million fund to compensate these victims. Over 20,000 current and past female employees that were employed after 1974 are eligible.

2020s
On 10 March 2020, Chief Allan Adam of the Athabasca Chipewyan First Nation was arrested by two RCMP officers in Fort McMurray, Alberta. After several minutes of Chief Adam yelling and posturing at officers, the officers tackled him and punched him in the head whilst struggling with him on the ground. Chief Adam was later charged with resisting arrest and assaulting a peace officer, but the charges were subsequently dropped. After watching the video of the arrest, Prime Minister Justin Trudeau said, "[w]e have all now seen the shocking video of Chief Adam's arrest and we must get to the bottom of this". Following the revelation of Chief Adam's arrest—as well as several other recent instances in which RCMP officers had assaulted or killed Indigenous people—RCMP Commissioner Brenda Lucki stated, after initially demurring on the question, that systemic racism exists in the RCMP: "I do know that systemic racism is part of every institution, the RCMP included", she said. One day earlier, Trudeau had also stated that "[s]ystemic racism is an issue right across the country, in all our institutions, including in all our police services, including in the RCMP."

RCMP Constable Heidi Stevenson was killed while responding to the Wortman killing spree that left 23 dead in Nova Scotia in April 2020. The political furore that followed engulfed Commissioner Brenda Lucki and her then-boss, Public Safety Minister Bill Blair. The RCMP was strongly criticized for its response to the 2020 Nova Scotia attacks, the deadliest rampage in Canadian history, as well as their lack of transparency in the criminal investigation. CBC News' television program The Fifth Estate and online newspaper Halifax Examiner analyzed the timeline of events, and both observed a myriad of failures and shortcomings in the RCMP response. A criminologist criticised the RCMP's response as "a mess" and called for an overhaul in how the agency responds to active shooter situations, after they had failed to properly respond to other such incidents in the past.

In the early 2020s, several governments, politicians, and scholars have recommended terminating the RCMP's contract policing program. Public Safety Minister Marco Mendicino was mandated to conduct a review of RCMP contract policing when he took office in 2022.

In June 2021, Privacy Commissioner of Canada Daniel Therrien found that the RCMP had broken Canadian privacy law through hundreds of illegal searches using Clearview AI.

In February 2022, four men were arrested near Coutts, Alberta for their roles in an alleged conspiracy to kill RCMP officers during the Canada convoy protest.

On 19 September 2022 the RCMP led the procession through London, England, following the state funeral of Queen Elizabeth II due to the long-standing special relationship with the Queen.

Role in colonization
As the federal police service, the RCMP has had an expansive and controversial role in the enforcement of colonial laws. One of the RCMP's two preceding agencies, the Royal North-West Mounted Police (RNWMP), had enjoyed a relatively positive relationship with the Indigenous peoples of Canada, buoyed by their role in restoring order to the Canadian West, which had been disrupted by colonial expansion, and the stark contrast between Canadian colonial policy and the ongoing American Indian Wars in the late 19th century. After the signing of the Numbered Treaties between 1871 and 1899, however, the service generally failed to provide Indigenous communities with police services equal to those provided to non-Indigenous communities.

American historian Andrew Graybill has argued that the RCMP historically resembled the Texas Rangers in many ways. He argues that each protected the established order by confining and removing Indigenous peoples; tightly controlling the mixed blood peoples (the African Americans in Texas and the Métis in Canada); assisting the large-scale ranchers against the small-scale ranchers and farmers who fenced the land; and breaking the power of labour unions that tried to organize the workers of industrial corporations.

Between 1920 and 1996, RCMP officers served as truant officers for the Canadian Indian residential school system, which was found to have amounted to cultural genocide, citing parents who refused to allow their children attend residential schools and assisting Indian agents in bringing children to the schools, sometimes by force.

During the federal government's imposition of municipal-style elected councils on First Nations, the RCMP raided the government buildings of particularly resistant traditional hereditary chiefs' councils and oversaw the subsequent council elections the Six Nations of the Grand River Elected Council was originally referred to as the "Mounties Council" as a result of the RCMP's involvement in its installation.

In 1995, the RCMP intervened in the Gustafsen Lake standoff between the armed Ts'peten Defenders, who were occupying unceded Indigenous land, and armed ranchers who owned the property but had previously allowed Indigenous people to use  part of the land for religious ceremonies. The RCMP's response included 400 tactical assault team members, five helicopters, two surveillance planes and nine Bison armoured personnel carriers on loan from the Canadian Army, and sparked international controversy over the RCMP's use of unusually broad press exclusion zones. One of the members of the Ts'peten Defenders was later granted political asylum in the United States after an Oregon judge found that the RCMP's reporting of the incident marked by an RCMP member's off-hand comment to media that "smear campaigns are [the RCMP's] specialty" amounted to a "disinformation campaign."

Between January 2019 and March 2020, the RCMP spent $13 million policing and periodically enforcing injunction orders against unarmed Indigenous land occupiers protesting the construction of a pipeline across unceded Wet'suwet'en territory. Despite the unarmed and largely peaceful nature of the occupation, part of the RCMP expense was spent on heavily-armed tactical teams, lethal overwatch, police dogs, and helicopters. The RCMP's enforcement of a court injunction against the occupiers in 2020 sparked international controversy and protests, and as of 2022, sporadic occupations and protests some of them violent have continued at the site.

As of 2022, several large Indigenous communities do not have RCMP detachments and are instead served by detachments located in much smaller non-Indigenous communities. During the Canadian National Inquiry into Missing and Murdered Indigenous Women and Girls, several witnesses described apathy or disrespect on the part of officers taking statements about violence against Indigenous women, while others said that some officers declined to take statements altogether.

Women in the RCMP

In the 1920s, Saskatchewan provincial pathologist Frances Gertrude McGill began providing forensic assistance to the RCMP in their investigations. She helped establish the first RCMP forensic laboratory in 1937, and later served as its director for several years. In addition to her forensic work, McGill also provided training to new RCMP and police recruits in forensic detection methods. Upon her retirement in 1946, McGill was appointed honorary surgeon to the RCMP, and continued to act as a dedicated consultant for the service up until her death in 1959.

On 23 May 1974, RCMP Commissioner Maurice Nadon announced that the RCMP would accept applications from women as regular members of the service. Troop 17 was the first group of 32 women at Depot in Regina on 18 and 19 September 1974 for regular training. This first all-female troop graduated from Depot on 3 March 1975.

After initially wearing different uniforms, female officers were finally issued the standard RCMP uniforms. Now all officers are identically attired, with two exceptions. The ceremonial dress uniform, or "walking-out order", for female members has a long, blue skirt and higher-heeled slip-on pumps plus small black clutch purse (however, in 2012 the RCMP began to allow women to wear trousers and boots with all their formal uniforms.) The second exception is the official maternity uniform for pregnant female officers assigned to administrative duties.

The following years saw the first women attain certain positions. 

 1981: corporal, musical ride
 1987: foreign post
 1990: detachment commander
 1992: commissioned officer
 1998: assistant commissioner
 2000: deputy commissioner
 2006: interim commissioner
 2018: permanent commissioner

Organization

International
The RCMP International Operations Branch (IOB) assists the Liaison Officer (LO) Program to deter international crime relating to Canadian criminal laws. The IOB is a section of the International Policing, which is part of the RCMP Federal and International Operations Directorate. Thirty-seven Liaison Officers are placed in 23 other countries and are responsible for organizing Canadian investigations in other countries, developing and maintaining the exchange of criminal intelligence, especially national security with other countries, to provide assistance in investigations that directly affect Canada, to coordinate and assist RCMP officers on foreign business and to represent the RCMP at international meetings.

Liaison Officers are located in:

Africa & Middle East:
 Rabat, Morocco
 Pretoria, South Africa
 Amman, Jordan
 Dubai, U.A.E. 
Asia-Pacific:
 New Delhi, India
 Islamabad, Pakistan
 Bangkok, Thailand
 Hong Kong SAR
 Beijing, China
 Kuala Lumpur, Malaysia
 Colombo, Sri Lanka
 Europe:
 London, United Kingdom
 Mons, Belgium (Supreme Headquarters Allied Powers Europe)
 Paris, France
 Berlin, Germany
 The Hague, Netherlands
 Gdynia, Poland
 Rome, Italy 
The Americas:
 Kingston, Jamaica
 Mexico City, Mexico
 Bogotá, Colombia
 Caracas, Venezuela
 Brasília, Brazil
 Santo Domingo, Dominican Republic
 Port of Spain, Trinidad and Tobago
 United States:
 Miami, Florida
 New York, New York
 Seattle, Washington
 Washington, D.C.

The RCMP also provides law enforcement training overseas in Iraq and other Canadian peacekeeping missions. The RCMP have been involved in training and logistically supporting the Haitian National Police since 1994, a controversial matter in Canada considering allegations of widespread human rights violations on the part of the HNP. Some Canadian activist groups have called for an end to the RCMP training.

National
The RCMP is organized under the authority of the Royal Canadian Mounted Police Act (RCMP Act), an act of the Parliament of Canada. Pursuant to sections 3 and 4 of the RCMP Act, the RCMP is a police service for Canada—namely, a federal police service. However, section 20 of the RCMP Act provides that the RCMP may be used for law enforcement in provinces or municipalities if certain conditions are met. As explained by Justice Ivan Rand of the Supreme Court of Canada, "what is set up is a police service for the whole of Canada to be used in the enforcement of the laws of the Dominion, but at the same time available for the enforcement of law generally in such provinces as may desire to employ its services."

Pursuant to section 5 of the RCMP Act, the agency is headed by the commissioner of the RCMP, who, under the direction of the minister of public safety and emergency preparedness, has the control and management of the service and all matters connected therewith. The RCMP is provided with a senior executive committee (SEC) which 

The commissioner is assisted by deputy commissioners in charge of Contract and Indigenous Policing, Federal Policing, and Specialized Policing Services. The commanding officers of K Division and E Division are also named deputy commissioners.

Divisions
The RCMP divides the country into divisions for command purposes. In general, each division is coterminous with a province (for example, C Division is Quebec). The province of Ontario, however, is divided into two divisions: National Division (Ottawa) and O Division (rest of the province). There is one additional division Depot Division, which is the RCMP Academy at Regina, Saskatchewan, and the Police Dog Service Training Centre at Innisfail, Alberta. The RCMP headquarters are located in Ottawa, Ontario.

 National Division (formerly A Division): National Capital Region (Ottawa, Ontario, and Gatineau, Quebec)
 B Division: Newfoundland and Labrador
 C Division: Quebec
 D Division: Manitoba
 E Division: British Columbia
 F Division: Saskatchewan

 G Division: Northwest Territories
 H Division: Nova Scotia
 J Division: New Brunswick
 K Division: Alberta
 L Division: Prince Edward Island
 M Division: Yukon
 O Division: Ontario
 V Division: Nunavut
 Depot Division at Regina and the Police Dog Service Training Centre at Innisfail.

Detachments

A detachment is a section of the RCMP which polices a local area. Detachments vary greatly in size. The largest single RCMP detachment is in the city of Surrey in British Columbia, with over a thousand employees. Surrey has contracted with the RCMP for policing services since 1951. The second-largest RCMP detachment is in Burnaby, also in British Columbia. Conversely, detachments in small, isolated rural communities have as few as three officers. The RCMP formerly had many single-officer detachments in these areas, but in 2012 the RCMP announced that it was introducing a requirement that detachments should have at least three officers.

Personal Protection Group

The Personal Protection Group, or PPG, is a 180-member group responsible for security details for VIPs, the governor general, and the prime minister. It was created after the 1995 break-in at 24 Sussex Drive. Units under the PPG consist of:

Governor General's Protection Detail: provides bodyguards to protect the Governor General of Canada in Canada and abroad. This unit is based in Ottawa, with operations at Rideau Hall.
Prime Minister's Protective Detail: provides bodyguards to protect the Prime Minister of Canada in Canada and abroad. This unit is based in Ottawa, with operations at 24 Sussex Drive and Harrington Lake, near Chelsea, Quebec.
Very Important Persons Security Section (VIPSS): provides security details to VIP (including the Chief Justice of Canada, federal ministers other than the prime minister, and diplomats) and others under the direction of the minister of public safety.

Personnel
, the RCMP employed 30,196 men and women, including police officers, civilian members, and public service employees.

Actual personnel strength by ranks:

 Commissioners: 1
 Deputy commissioners: 6
 Assistant commissioners: 28
 Chief superintendents: 57
 Superintendents: 187
 Inspectors: 322
 Corps sergeants major: 1
 Sergeants major: 8
 Staff sergeants major: 9
 Staff sergeants: 838
 Sergeants: 2,018
 Corporals: 3,599
 Constables: 11,913
 Special constables: 122
 Civilian members: 7,695
 Public servants: 3,403
 Total: 30,196

Regular members

The term regular member, or RM, originates from the RCMP Act and refers to the 18,988 regular RCMP officers who are trained and sworn as peace officers, and include all the ranks from constable to commissioner. They are the police officers of the RCMP and are responsible for investigating crime and have the authority to make arrests. RMs operate in over 750 detachments, including 200 municipalities and more than 600 Indigenous communities. RMs are normally assigned to general policing duties at an RCMP detachment for a minimum of three years. These duties allow them to experience a broad range of assignments and experiences, such as responding to emergency (9-1-1) calls, foot patrol, bicycle patrol, traffic enforcement, collecting evidence at crime scenes, testifying in court, apprehending criminals and plain clothes duties. Regular members also serve in over 150 different types of operational and administrative opportunities available within the RCMP, these include: major crime investigations, emergency response, forensic identification, forensic collision reconstruction, international peacekeeping, bike or marine patrol, explosives disposal and police dog services. Also included are administrative roles including human resources, corporate planning, policy analysis and public affairs.

Auxiliary constables and other staff
Besides the regular RCMP officers, several types of designations exist which give them assorted powers and responsibilities over policing issues.

Currently, there are:
 Community constables: Varies across Canada 
 Reserve constables : Varies across Canada
 Auxiliary constables: Varies across Canada
 Special constables: 122
 Civilian criminal investigators: 35 
 Civilian members: 7,590
 Public servants: 3,497

Community constables (CC)A designation introduced in 2014 as a replacement for the community safety officers and Indigenous community constables pilot programs. Community constables are armed, paid members holding the rank of special constables, with peace officer power. They are to provide a bridge between the local citizens and the RCMP using their local and cultural knowledge. They are mostly focused on crime prevention, liaisons with the community, and providing resources in the event of a large-scale event.

Reserve constables (R/Cst.)A program reinstated in 2004 in British Columbia, it was later expanded to cover all of Canada in order to allow for retired, regular RCMP members and other provincially trained officers to provide extra manpower when shortages are identified. R/Cst. are appointed under Section 11 of the Royal Canadian Mounted Police Act as paid part-time, armed officers with the same powers as regular members. However, they are not allowed to carry service-issued sidearms and use of force options unless they are called upon to duty. They generally carry out community policing roles but may also be called upon if an emergency occurs.

Auxiliary constables (A/Cst.)Volunteers within their own community, appointed under provincial police acts. They are not police officers and can not identify themselves as such. However, they are given peace officer powers when on duty with a regular member (RM). Their duties consist mainly of assisting RMs in routine events, for example cordoning off crime scene areas, crowd control, participating in community policing, assistance during situations where regular members might be overwhelmed with their duties (e.g., keeping watch of a backseat detainee while an RM interviews a victim). They are identified by the wording of "RCMP Auxiliary" on cars, jackets and shoulder flashes.

Special constables (S/Cst.) Employees of the RCMP have varied duties depending on where they are deployed, but are often given this designation because of an expertise they possess which needs to be applied in a certain area. For example, an Indigenous person might be appointed a special constable in order to assist regular members as they police an Indigenous community where English is not well understood, and where the special constable speaks the language well. They still perform this role today in many isolated northern communities and the RCMP has 122 special constables who are active in the RCMP today, and they are drawn almost entirely from the same Indigenous communities that they serve.

From the early years of policing in northern Canada, and well into the 1950s, local Indigenous peoples were hired by the RCMP as special constables and were employed as guides and to obtain and care for sled dog teams. Many of these former special constables still reside in the north to this day and are still involved in regimental functions of the RCMP.

Most pilots for RCMP aircraft, such as fixed wing planes or helicopters, are special constables.

 Civilian criminal investigators (CCI) CCIs were implemented in 2021. They are civilian unarmed staff members, with limited peace officer status and are restricted from making physical arrests. CCIs have backgrounds in computer science and/or financial markets and are involved in specialized investigations. They participate in interviews, preparation of court documents and the searching of scenes.

Civilian members of the RCMP While not delegated the powers of police officers, they are instead hired for their specialized scientific, technological, communications and administrative skills. Since the RCMP is a multi-faceted law enforcement organization with responsibilities for federal, provincial and municipal policing duties, it offers employment opportunities for civilian members as professional partners within Canada's national police service.

Civilian members represent approximately 14 per cent of the total RCMP employee population, and are employed within RCMP establishments in most geographical areas of Canada. The following is a list of the most common categories of employment that may be available to interested and qualified individuals.

 Administrative
 Human resource management
 Police Records Information Management Environment (PRIME-BC)
 Policy development and analysis
 Staff development and training
 Translation
Operations
 Telecommunications operator (dispatcher)
 Scientific
 Biology – DNA
 Chemistry
 Law
 Toxicology
Technical
 Communications
 Computer systems development
 Counterfeit analysis
 Document examination
 Electronics technology
 Firearms technology
 Forensic identification services
 Information services/public affairs
 Information technology
 Instrument technology
 Telecommunications

Public service employees Also referred to as public servants, PSes or PSEs, they provide much of the administrative support for the RCMP in the form of detachment clerks and other administrative support at the headquarters level. They are not police officers, do not wear a uniform, have no police authority and are not bound by the RCMP Act.

Municipal employees
Abbreviated as "ME" they are found in RCMP detachments where a contract exists with a municipality to provide front-line policing. MEs are not actually employees of the RCMP, but are instead employed by the local municipality to work in the RCMP detachment. They conduct the same duties that a PSE would and are required to meet the same reliability and security clearance to do so. Many detachment buildings house a combination of municipally and provincially funded detachments, and therefore there are often PSEs and MEs found working together in them.

Ranks

The rank system of the RCMP is partly a result of their origin as a paramilitary service. Upon its founding, the RCMP adopted the rank insignias of the Canadian Army (which in turn came from the British Army). Like in a military, the RCMP also has a distinction between commissioned and non-commissioned officers. The non-commissioned ranks are mostly based on military ranks (apart from constable). Non-commissioned officer ranks above staff sergeant resemble those that formerly existed in the Canadian Army, but have since been replaced by warrant officers. The commissioned officer ranks, by contrast, use a set of non-military titles that are often used in Commonwealth police services. The number of higher ranks like chief superintendent and deputy commissioner have been added on and increased since the formation of the service, while the lower commissioned rank of sub-inspector has been dropped.

The numbers are current as of April 1, 2019:

 These are the official abbreviations for the commissioned and non-commissioned officers in the RCMP.

The ranks of inspector and higher are commissioned ranks and are appointed by the Governor-in-Council. Depending on the dress, badges are worn on the shoulder as slip-ons, on shoulder boards, or directly on the epaulettes. The lower ranks are non-commissioned officers and the insignia continues to be based on pre-1968 Canadian Army patterns. Since 1990, the non-commissioned officers' rank insignia has been embroidered on the epaulette slip-ons. Non-commissioned rank badges are worn on the right sleeve of the scarlet/blue tunic and blue jacket. Constables wear no rank insignia. There are also 122 special constables, as well as a varying number of reserve constables, auxiliary constables, and students who wear identifying insignia.

The star, or "pip", used in the insignia of commissioned officers represents the military Knight Grand Cross of the Order of the Bath. The order's motto ("three joined in one", referring to the holy trinity) is inscribed in a band in the middle of it. The three crowns inset in the centre not only represent the Christian Trinity, but also the three former kingdoms that became the United Kingdom. The RCMP formerly had subaltern (junior officer) ranks that were indicated by one "pip" for a sub-inspector (equivalent to an army second lieutenant) to three "pips" for an inspector (equivalent to an army captain). A reorganization in 1960 changed the insignia to three "pips" for sub-inspectors and a crown for inspectors, making the latter a field officer rank. The rank of sub-inspector was abolished in 1990, leaving the RCMP with no subaltern ranks.

A royal crown is used in the regimental cap badge and the insignia of senior commissioned officers. In 1955 St. Edward's Crown replaced the Tudor Crown. Although Queen Elizabeth II had adopted the redesign of the heraldic crown in 1953, it took some time to design, approve, and manufacture the new insignia.

The crossed Mameluke sabre and baton is the insignia for general officers. In the RCMP it designates the commissioner (equivalent to an army general) and their subordinate deputy commissioners (equivalent to army lieutenant-generals). The assistant commissioners use the crown-over-three-pips insignia of an army brigadier.

The brass shoulder title pin on the epaulettes was changed from "RCMP" to "GRC-RCMP" in 1968. This was due to a 1968 ruling stating that all statutes had to be published bilingually in both English and French. As a law enforcement agency, the RCMP had to use ranks and titles in both languages. This was later reinforced by the Official Languages Act.

Honorary positions 
Various members of the Canadian royal family have held and hold honorary positions in the RCMP.

Equipment and vehicles

Land fleet

The RCMP Land Transport Fleet inventory includes:

 Cars: 5,330
 Unmarked vehicles: 2,811
 Light trucks: 2,090
 Heavy trucks: 123 
 SUVs: 616 
 Motorcycles: 34
 Small snowmobiles: 481
 All-terrain vehicles: 181
 Gas railway cars: 1
 Tractors: 27
 Buses: 3
 Total: 11,697

Marine craft

The RCMP polices Canadian Internal Waters, including the territorial sea and contiguous zone as well as the Great Lakes and Saint Lawrence Seaway; such operations are provided by the RCMP's Federal Services Directorate and includes enforcing Canada's environment, fisheries, customs and immigration laws. In provinces and municipalities where the RCMP performs contract policing, the service polices freshwater lakes and rivers.

To meet these challenges, the RCMP operates the Marine Division, with five Robert Allan Ltd.–designed high-speed catamaran patrol vessels; Inkster and the Commissioner-class Nadon, Higgitt, Lindsay and Simmonds, based on all three coasts and manned by officers specially trained in maritime enforcement. Inkster is based in Prince Rupert, BC, Simmonds is stationed on Newfoundland's south coast, and the rest are on the Pacific Coast. Simmonds' livery is unique, in that it sports the RCMP badge, but is otherwise painted with Canadian Coast Guard colours and the marking Coast Guard Police. The other four vessels are painted with blue and white RCMP colours.

This category ranges from canoes and car toppers to rigid-hulled inflatables and stable, commercially built, inboard-outboard vessels. Individual detachments often have smaller high-speed rigid-hulled inflatable boats and other purpose-built vessels for inland waters, some of which can be hauled by road to the nearest launching point.

Aircraft fleet

As of February 2023, the RCMP had 35 police aircraft (9 helicopters and 26 fixed-wing aircraft) registered with Transport Canadaand operate as ICAO airline designator SST, and telephony STETSON. All aircraft are operated and maintained by the Air Services Branch.

Weapons and intervention options
 

 Smith & Wesson Model 5946 (1992–present) – Standard full-sized service sidearm. It is stainless-steel, double-action only, with a  barrel and a double-column 15-round magazine. 
 Emergency response team (ERT) and dog handler members were issued modified Model 5946s with magazine safeties removed until they were replaced with the SIG Sauer P226R.
 Smith & Wesson Model 3953 (1996–present) – Special issue compact sidearm for plainclothes members and commissioned officers. It can also be requested as a service pistol by members with small hands who cannot positively grip the larger Model 5946. It is similar to the Model 5946 except it has a shorter  barrel, a shortened grip, and a single-column eight-round magazine.
 SIG Sauer 226R (9×19mm ) – Standard issue sidearm for ERT and dog-handler members. It replaced the modified Model 5946 that had been previously issued.
 Glock Model 19 – Special issue sidearm for Canadian Air Carrier Protective Program (CACPP) members.
 Heckler & Koch MP5 – Adopted by the ERT
 Remington Model 700P (.308 Winchester) bolt-action rifle
 Remington 870 12-gauge shotgun
 Colt Canada C7 rifle (5.56mm NATO)
 Colt Canada C8 carbine (5.56mm NATO) – Adopted by ERT 
 Colt Canada C8 IUR (integrated upper receiver ) 5.56mm NATO. The semi-automatic C8 IUR was adopted for general use in October, 2011, but the first batch were not procured until 2013. The first RCMP Cadets began qualifying on the C8 IUR and receiving Active Shooter training in 2015.
 Taser International M26, X26, and X26P. Following the Robert Dziekański incident, all older M26 models and 60 faulty X26 models in stock were removed and destroyed in 2010 due to being outside of specifications.
 Oleoresin capsicum spray
 ASP and Monadnock expandable defensive batons

Past weapons and intervention options
Rifles
 Canadian Arsenals Limited (CAL) C1A1 – issued in 7.62mm NATO. Canadian variant of the L1A1 and FN FAL produced under licence by Canadian Arsenals Limited (CAL) (Long Branch). The RCMP's rifles were sourced from the testing batch of FALs received from Fabrique Nationale and had been rebuilt by CAL to meet C1A1 standards. Used from 1961 to 1969. 
 Winchester Model 70 Issued in .308 Winchester. Used from 1960–1973. This rifle was replaced by the Remington 700.
 Lee–Enfield No. 4 Mk 1 – issued in .303 British. World War II surplus rifles used from 1947 to 1966. Replaced by CAL C1A1 and Winchester 70.
 Short Magazine Lee Enfield (SMLE) No. 1 Mk III – issued in .303 British. World War I surplus rifles used from 1919–1947.
 Lee-Enfield carbine (LEC) – issued in .303 British. Procured as military surplus from militia stores to replace the unsatisfactory Ross Rifle. Used from 1914 to 1920. This was the last general-issue rifle used by the NWMP. The RCMP that replaced it only issued rifles according to need.
 Ross rifle – issued in .303 British. The Ross Mk I was issued from 1905 to 1907 and the improved Ross Mk II was in testing from 1909 to 1912. The Mk I design was accepted by the Canadian Militia in 1903. The NWMP looked at acquiring the Ross to replace the Winchester and Lee-Metford and ordered 1000. Production problems led to delays until 1904; the most glaring being that the finished product did not match their original specifications. The NWMP demanded their contract carbines use a different set of iron sight (which later became standard on the Mk II) which delayed production for a further year. The carbines received in 1905 were plagued with quality control problems that made them more fragile than the weapons they were to replace. After a constable suffered an eye injury in 1907 the Ross carbines were withdrawn. When the improved Ross Mk II rifles arrived in 1909 the wary NWMP decided to test fire all of them fully before issuing them. A fire at the depot in Regina in 1911 destroyed almost all of the new rifles. The NWMP then gave up on the Ross.
 Magazine Lee-Enfield (MLE) Mk.I rifle – issued in .303 British; it was the first smokeless-powder weapon in NWMP service. Loaned to the NWMP from the Victoria and Winnipeg militias to replace a stolen cache of M1876 Winchesters. The NWMP "forgot" to give them back later. Used from 1902 to 1920. 
 Lee-Metford carbine – issued in .303 British. The Metford rifling gave tighter groups when fired than the later Enfield, but the rifling wore out faster. Only 200 procured. Used from 1895 to 1914. Replaced by the Lee-Enfield carbine.
 Winchester Model 1876 saddle carbine—issued in .45-75 Winchester. Popular for its handiness and rate of fire, but it was too fragile for the rough handling and use it received in the field. Used from 1878 until 1914. and replaced by the Lee-Enfield Carbine.
 Snider–Enfield Mark III cavalry carbine – issued in .577 Snider. Single-shot breach-loading conversion of an Enfield caplock muzzle-loader. Used from 1873 to 1878 and replaced by the Winchester Model 1876 lever-action rifle. 
Service pistols
 Smith & Wesson military and police revolver—issued with  barrel, in .38 Special. It served more than forty years from 1954 to 1996. Plainclothes members carried a variant with a  barrel. 
In 1981, the standard loading was changed from a  .38 Special full metal jacket (FMJ) ball round to a  .38 Special +P semi-wadCutter hollow-point (SWCHP), a violation of the Hague Convention of 1899 if used in a military context.
 Colt New Service revolver — issued with 5.5 in (140 mm) barrel; 700 ordered in .455 Webley in 1904, with .45 Long Colt versions being delivered from 1919; in all, over 3200 issued. 455 Webley was the British military service round and .45 Long Colt was the standard Canadian service round until both were replaced by the NATO-standard 9×19mm Parabellum post World War II. Used from 1904 to 1954. 
 Enfield Mark II revolver—issued in .476 Enfield, about 1080 Mark IIs obtained from Britain's Ministry of Defence, after it was learned the Beaumont–Adams had been discontinued. The remaining .450 Adams ammunition, which was compatible with the .476 Enfield round, was issued until stocks were depleted. Used from 1882 to 1911.
 Beaumont–Adams revolver—first issue weapon, in .450 Adams. 330 Mark Is purchased from Britain's Ministry of Defence in 1873 and issued after delivery in 1874. Rough handling of the crates in transit, poor packing by the contractor who shipped the guns, and previous service wear made them unsuitable for service. The constables sometimes had to manually turn the cylinders due to cracked feed hands or keep both hands on the grips for the springs to work due to loose screws. Later, these were to be replaced by 330 Enfield Mark IIs, but many were stolen en route. Used from 1874 to 1888.

Pistols
Because of procurement problems with the Beaumont–Adams revolvers, constables sometimes carried their own sidearms chambered in a standard service caliber.
 Tranter revolver – chambered in .450 Adams, the standard service round. It was similar to the Beaumont-Adams revolver it was substituted for.
 Smith & Wesson Model 3 revolver – chambered in .44 Russian, a very powerful cartridge in its day. Thirty were purchased in 1874 by the NWMP to field-test the .44 Russian round for service. Its non-standard chambering and the difficulty to get ammunition for it led to its being withdrawn.
 Webley & Scott Bull Dog revolver – chambered in .450 Adams. Its small size made it a handy backup pistol. Most were originally procured to arm NWMP constables assigned to protecting mail cars on trains. The constables would sometimes "absent-mindedly forget" to hand the pistols back afterwards.

Sidearms
 1821 pattern light cavalry sabre – Originally part of a trove of old swords given by the Canadian Militia to the NWMP as weapons. They were returned to stores in 1880. Later issued to commissioned officers in 1882 as ceremonial sidearms and a sign of rank. This was later replaced by the M1896 light cavalry sabre.
 1853 pattern cavalry sabre – Originally part of a trove of old swords given by the Canadian Militia to the NWMP as weapons. They were returned to stores in 1880. Later issued in 1882 to non-commissioned officers as ceremonial sidearms and a sign of rank. This was later replaced by the 1821 pattern sabre. 
 1896 pattern light cavalry sabre – Replaced the 1821 pattern sabre as the NWMP officer's ceremonial sword.
 1908 pattern cavalry saber – Carried by the Mounted Police detachment sent to Siberia in 1918 during the Russian Civil War. 
 Straightstick baton manufactured in wood and plastic
 Sap gloves – Prohibited by RCMP policy. Not currently used.

Ceremonial weapons and symbols of office
 1912 pattern cavalry officer's sword carried by officers. Blade is acid etched both sides with the monarch's crown, Canadian coat of Arms, royal cypher and RCMP badge.
 1908 pattern cavalry sword carried by NCOs on the Musical Ride
 Bamboo-shafted lance carried by members on horseback on the Musical Ride. The lance is used as a decorative item and is flourished during trick and formation riding. The pennant is red over white, the national colours of the Canadian flag. It represents the Pattern 1868 cavalry lance carried by the NWMP in the 1870s.
 Drill cane
 Swagger stick
 Commissioner's tipstaff

In 1973, Wilkinson Sword produced a number of commemorative swords to celebrate the RCMP centennial. None of these swords were ever used ceremonially, and were strictly collectibles. Wilkinson Sword also made a commemorative centennial tomahawk and miniature "letter opener" models of their centennial swords.

In 1973, Winchester Repeating Arms Company produced an RCMP commemorative centennial version of their Model 94 rifle in .30-30 Winchester, with a  round barrel. The receiver, buttplate, and forend cap (on the musket-style forend) were plated in gold. Commemorative medallions were embedded in the right-hand side of the stock, with an "MP" engraving. There was engraving on the barrel and receiver indicating the rifle was a centennial commemorative edition. Two versions were produced, 9500 with serial numbers beginning "RCMP" for commercial sale, 5000 with the prefix "MP" sold only to serving RCMP members. In addition, ten presentation models were produced, serialled RCMP1P to RCMP10P.

Uniform

Operational uniform

RCMP officers on frontline police duties wear grey shirts with RCMP shoulder flashes, navy blue pants with gold trouser piping, bulletproof vests, and a peaked cap with a solid gold band. High ranking officers wear white shirts. A tie can be worn with the long-sleeved shirt for occasions such as testifying in court. In colder weather, members may wear heavier boots, winter coats, and wool toques, or uniquely, muskrat fur caps.

In 1990, Baltej Singh Dhillon became the RCMP's first Sikh officer to be allowed to wear a turban instead of the traditional campaign hat. During the COVID-19 pandemic, Sikh, Muslim, and other bearded officers were initially assigned to administrative duties before being permitted to attend calls for service with low viral transmission risks after officer outcry. The beards required as part of the Sikh practice of kesh and worn by some Muslim men prevented respirator masks from properly sealing around the mouth and nose, reducing their effectiveness.

As of 2019, all RCMP officers, regardless of religious belief, are allowed to wear full beards or braided hair below their collar. Officers may also wear a ballcap in place of the traditional peaked cap.

Dress uniform

RCMP officers are equipped with a dress uniform, popularly known as the "blue serge," for performing certain formal duties, such as media relations or parliament testimony. It consists of a navy blue dress jacket with epaulettes and brass buttons, a white shirt, navy blue tie, navy blue pants with gold trouser piping, and a peaked cap with a solid gold band. Shoulder flashes are not worn.

Ceremonial uniform

For most formal and ceremonial duties, RCMP wear the internationally-famous Red Serge. It has a high collared scarlet tunic, which was developed by the Northwest Mounted Police and coloured red to distinguish it from blue American military uniforms, midnight blue breeches with yellow trouser piping, an oxblood Sam Browne belt with white sidearm lanyard and matching oxblood riding boots, brown felt campaign hat with a "Montana crease" (pinched symmetrically at the four corners), and oxblood gloves. Since 1990, identical ceremonial uniforms have been worn by both men and women.

Decorations
Members receive a clasp and service badge star for every five years of service. The King of Canada also awards the Royal Canadian Mounted Police Long Service Medal to members who have completed 20 years' service. A clasp is awarded for each successive 5 years to 40 years. Members also receive a service badge star for each five years' service, which is worn on the left sleeve. There are specialist insignia for positions such as first aid instructor and dog handler, and pilot's wings are worn by aviators. Sharpshooter badges for proficiency in pistol or rifle shooting are each awarded in two grades. Sharpshooter badges and service badge stars are sewn onto the left sleeve of the red serge.

Tartan

The RCMP has since 1998 had its own distinctive tartan. The creation of the tartan was the result of a committee created in the early 1990s to create a tartan by its 125th anniversary. Upon approval from commissioner Phillip Murray, the tartan was registered with the Scottish Tartans Society and presented to the agency by Anne, Princess Royal during her royal visit to Canada in 1998. The tartan appeared for the first time by a RCMP pipe band at the Royal Nova Scotia International Tattoo in July and August 1998.

Military status

Although the RCMP is a civilian police service, in 1921, following the service of many of its members during the First World War, King George V awarded the service the status of a regiment of dragoons, entitling it to display the battle honours it had been awarded.

Service in wartime
During the Second Boer War, members of the North-West Mounted Police were given leaves of absence to join the 2nd Battalion, Canadian Mounted Rifles (CMR) and Strathcona's Horse. The service raised the Canadian Mounted Rifles, mostly from NWMP members, for service in South Africa. For the CMR's distinguished service there, King Edward VII honoured the NWMP by changing the name to the "Royal Northwest Mounted Police" (RNWMP) on June 24, 1904.

During the First World War, the Royal Northwest Mounted Police (RNWMP) conducted border patrols, surveillance of enemy aliens, and enforcement of national security regulations within Canada. However, RNWMP officers also served overseas. On August 6, 1914, a squadron of volunteers from the RNWMP was formed to serve with the Canadian Light Horse in France. In 1918, two more squadrons were raised, A Squadron for service in France and Flanders and B Squadron for service in the Canadian Siberian Expeditionary Force.

In September 1939, at the outset of the Second World War, the Canadian Army had no military police. Five days after war was declared the Royal Canadian Mounted Police received permission to form a provost company of service volunteers. It was designated "No. 1 Provost Company (RCMP)", and became the Canadian Provost Corps. Six months after war was declared its members were overseas in Europe and served throughout the Second World War as military police.

RCMP members were embedded with several military units in Afghanistan during the War in Afghanistan from 2001–14. The RCMP was a member agency in the Afghan Threat Finance Cell, a multi-agency intelligence organization formed in 2008.

Honours
The Royal Canadian Mounted Police were accorded the status of a regiment of dragoons in 1921. As a cavalry regiment, the RCMP was entitled to wear battle honours for its war service as well as carry a guidon, with its first guidon presented in 1935.

Battle honours

 North West Canada 1885
 South Africa 1900–2
 The Great War: France and Flanders 1918, Siberia 1918–19
 The Second World War: Europe, 1939–45
 Afghanistan 2003–14 

The RCMP also carry the honorary distinctions for the Canadian Provost Corps (Military Police), presented September 21, 1957, at a Parliament Hill ceremony for contributions to the corps during the Second World War.

Public perception

The Mounties have been immortalized as symbols of Canadian culture in numerous Hollywood Northwestern movies and television series, which often feature the image of the Mountie as square-jawed, stoic, and polite, yet with a steely determination and physical toughness that sometimes appears superhuman. Coupled with the adage that the Mountie "always gets his man", the image projects them as fearsome, incorruptible, dogged yet gentle champions of the law. The RCMP's motto is actually the French phrase,  Maintiens le droit.  The motto has been variously translated into English as  "Defending the Law", "Maintain the right", and "Uphold the right". The Hollywood motto derives from a comment by a Montana newspaper, the Fort Benton Record: "They fetch their man every time".

In the past decades, Canadian public perception of the RCMP have become less favourable. In a 2022 Angus Reid survey found that 41 per cent of Canadians had little or no confidence in the RCMP, compared to 37 per cent of Canadians served by a provincial police service. The study also found that the RCMP as a whole was less trusted compared to municipal police services or individual RCMP detachments.

Depiction in media
In 1912, Ralph Connor's Corporal Cameron of the North-West Mounted Police: A Tale of the MacLeod Trail appeared, became an international best-selling novel. Mounties fiction became a popular genre in both pulp magazines and book form. Among the best-selling authors who specialized in tales of the Mounted Police were James Oliver Curwood, Laurie York Erskine, James B Hendryx, T Lund, Harwood Steele (the son of Sam Steele), and William Byron Mowery.

In other media, a famous example is the radio and television series, Sergeant Preston of the Yukon. Dudley Do-Right (of The Rocky and Bullwinkle Show) is a 1960s example of the comic aspect of the Mountie myth, as is Klondike Kat, from Total Television. The Broadway musical and Hollywood movie Rose-Marie is a 1930s example of its romantic side. A successful combination were a series of Renfrew of the Royal Mounted boy's adventure novels written by Laurie York Erskine beginning in 1922 running to 1941. In the 1930s Erskine narrated a Sgt Renfrew of the Mounties radio show and a series of films with actor-singer James Newill playing Renfrew were released between 1937 and 1940. In 1953 portions of the films were mixed with new sequences of Newill for a Renfrew of the Mounted television series.

Bruce Carruthers (b.1901–d.1953), a former Mounted Police corporal (1919–1923), served as an unofficial technical advisor to Hollywood in many films with RCMP characters. They included Heart of the North (1938), Susannah of the Mounties (1939), Northern Pursuit (1943), Gene Autry and The Mounties (1951), The Wild North (1952), and The Pony Soldier (1952).

Contemporary culture
In 1959, the Canadian Broadcasting Corporation aired R.C.M.P., a half-hour dramatic series about an RCMP detachment keeping the peace and fighting crime. Filmed in black and white, in and around Ottawa by Crawley Films, the series was co-produced with the BBC and the Australian Broadcasting Corporation and ran for 39 episodes. It was noted for its pairing of Québécois and Anglo officers.

Canadians also poke fun at the RCMP with Sergeant Renfrew and his faithful dog Cuddles in various sketches produced by the Royal Canadian Air Farce comedy troupe. On That '70s Show Mounties were played by SCTV alumni Joe Flaherty and Dave Thomas. The British have also exploited the myth: the BBC television series Monty Python's Flying Circus featured a group of Mounties singing the chorus in The Lumberjack Song in the lumberjack sketch.

The 1972–90 CBC series The Beachcombers features a character named Constable John Constable who attempts to enforce the law in the town of Gibsons, British Columbia.

In comic books, the Marvel Comics characters of Alpha Flight are described on several occasions as "RCMP auxiliaries", and two of their members, Snowbird and the second Major Mapleleaf are depicted as serving members of the service. In the latter case, due to trademark issues, Major Mapleleaf is described as a "Royal Canadian Mountie" in the opening roll call pages of each issue of Alpha Flight he appears in.

Charles Bronson and Lee Marvin starred in the 1981 movie Death Hunt that fictionalized the RCMP pursuit of Albert Johnson.

In the early 1990s, Canadian professional wrestler Jacques Rougeau utilized the gimmick of "The Mountie" while wrestling for the WWF. He typically wore the Red Serge to the ring, and carried a shock stick as an illegal weapon. As his character was portrayed as an evil Mountie, the RCMP ultimately won an injunction preventing Rougeau from wrestling as this character in Canada, though he was not prevented from doing so outside the country. He briefly held the Intercontinental Championship in 1992.

The 1998 swan song of Nick Berry's time on UK drama Heartbeat features his character, Sergeant Nick Rowan, transferring to Canada and taking the rank of constable in the Mounties. The special telemovie was titled Heartbeat: Changing Places.

The 1994–98 TV series Due South pairs Mountie Constable Benton Fraser with streetwise American detective Ray Vecchio cleaning up the streets of Chicago. It mainly derives its entertainment from the perceived differences in attitude and culture between these two countries' police services. Fraser is depicted as honest and polite to a fault, even refusing to carry a loaded sidearm when "assisting" Detective Vecchio, but is almost superhuman in his abilities for thwarting crime, especially while wearing the Red Serge uniform.

A pair of Mounties staff the RCMP detachment in the fictional town of Lynx River, Northwest Territories, in the CBC series North of 60. The series, which aired from 1992 to 1998, is about events in the mostly indigenous community, but the Mounties feature prominently in each episode.

Another TV series from the 1990s, Bordertown features an NWMP corporal paired with a U.S. marshal securing law and order on a frontier U.S.–Canada border town. In the ABC TV mini-series Answered by Fire, at least three mounties are featured. Mounties also appear in the TV series When Calls the Heart (Hallmark Channel).

The 1987 Brian De Palma film The Untouchables features cooperation between the Treasury Department task force, led by Eliot Ness, and the Mounties against liquor smuggling across the Canada–United States border.

The 1995 album C'est Cheese by Canadian musical comedy group The Arrogant Worms includes "The Mountie Song", which tells the story of a dissatisfied Mountie.

In his 1999, album Soiree Newfoundland musician A. Frank Willis included "Savage Cop in Savage Cove" which was based on a true story and went on to become a big hit.

Conan O'Brien brought his late night show to Toronto in February 2004. O'Brien spent a day as a Royal Canadian Mountie at the Canada–United States border.

In 2009, a 13-part documentary about the RCMP released, Courage in Red, was released.

From 2011, the CTV fantasy drama series The Listener regularly features characters who work for the Integrated Investigative Bureau, a fictional division of the RCMP that brings together various specialists, officers and civilian consultants to work on high-profile or federal cases. Although characters in the employ of the IIB are rarely, if ever, depicted wearing uniform, they are often addressed by their ranks – two main characters are Sergeant Michelle McClusky and Corporal Dev Clark.

In the 2021 IMDBtv series Leverage Redemption it is revealed characters Elliot Spencer, Sophie Devereaux, Parker and Breanna Casey will not do jobs in Canada because of the RCMP, who want them for various crimes.  The four claim the RCMP is the most dangerous police service in the world, will put you down politely and never forget a face, and that Mounties hate being called "Dudley Do-Right."

Merchandise and trademark
There are products and merchandise that are made in the image of the RCMP, like Mounties statues or hats. Before 1995, the RCMP had little control over these products.

The Royal Canadian Mounted Police received an international licence on April 1, 1995, requiring those who use the RCMP to pay a licensing fee. Proceeds from the fees are used for community awareness programmes. Those that do not pay the licensing fee are legally unable to use the name of the RCMP or their correct uniforms, though a film such as Canadian Bacon used the name "Royal Mounted Canadian Police" and the character in the Dudley Do-Right film did not wear accurate insignia.

Through a Master Licensing Agreement (MLA) with the RCMP, the RCMP Foundation is responsible for managing the commercial use of the RCMP name, image, and protected marks. The foundation issues selected companies a royalty-based agreement allowing them to produce and market high-quality official RCMP merchandise. Walt Disney Co. (Canada) Ltd. was contracted to aid in the initial set up of the licensing program but Disney never owned or controlled any of the RCMP's protected marks.

Following the expiration of the Disney contract in 2000, all responsibilities and activities were taken over by the executive director and his staff, reporting to the foundation president and board of directors. In 2007, through a decree signed by Commissioner Beverley Busson, the operating name was changed to the "Royal Canadian Mounted Police Foundation".

Public relations programs

RCMP community relationship building programs include the Musical Ride. The Musical Ride is an equestrian showcase of RCMP riders, that performs across Canada each year from May to October. The RCMP Sunset Ceremony has taken place every summer since 1989 at the Musical Ride Centre in Ottawa, with it in recent years featuring the Ottawa Police Service Pipe Band and the Governor General's Foot Guards Band. The RCMP National Ceremonial Troop is a unit that serves as dismounted version of the Musical Ride as well as a drill team. Individual divisions also have their own ceremonial troops.

The RCMP Heritage Centre is a multi-million dollar museum designed by Arthur Erickson that opened May 2007 in Regina, Saskatchewan, at the RCMP Academy, Depot Division. It replaced the old RCMP museum and is designed to celebrate the role of the service in Canada's history.

Bands

There are eight regional RCMP pipe bands across Canada that act as "garrison bands" for the provincial division, and attend parades, police ceremonies, and public events. The first of these bands were established in 1992 in Alberta. The following are the locations of the regional volunteer pipe bands:

Halifax
Moncton
Montreal (part of "C" Division)
Ottawa
Winnipeg
Regina (part of "F" Division)
Edmonton
Vancouver (part of "E" Division)

Prior to 1994, the RCMP also operated the Royal Canadian Mounted Police Band was the RCMP's central musical ensemble. It was considered one of the best professional bands assembled in Canada. Although it was an official regimental band, the members worked in the band as a secondary job. It is generally considered to have begun in 1938, though there were various police bands in the RCMP that flourished at the time, leading the Canadian government granting approval for the creation of a full-time central band in December 1958, with its headquarters in the capital of Ottawa. Appearances made by the band included Expo 86 and the Commonwealth Conference in Vancouver, the Calgary Winter Olympics in 1988, as well as the visits of Soviet President Mikhail Gorbachev and Queen Elizabeth II in 1990.

It was dissolved in 1994 due to government budget cuts. In its 55 year existence, it operated as a voluntary regimental band, with its members working with it as a secondary job apart from their other duties in the RCMP. Members of the band wore the RCMP's notable Red Serge as part of their full dress uniform and adopted drill seen in Canadian military bands and bands in the British Army. Its longest serving director was Superintendent Edwin Joseph Lydall who served from 1948 to 1968.

See also
 Civilian Review and Complaints Commission for the Royal Canadian Mounted Police
 List of Canadian organizations with royal patronage
 List of controversies involving the Royal Canadian Mounted Police
 List of law enforcement agencies in Canada
 List of Royal Canadian Mint RCMP coins
 RCMP harassment policy
 RCMP Technical Security Branch

Notes

References

External links

 Royal Canadian Mounted Police Reports 1929-1948 at Dartmouth College Library

 
Federal departments and agencies of Canada
Public Safety Canada
Government agencies established in 1920
Legal history of Canada
1920 establishments in Canada
Gendarmerie
Organizations based in Canada with royal patronage
Organizations based in Ottawa
Uniformed services of Canada
Federal law enforcement agencies of Canada
Nunavut law
Northwest Territories law
Yukon law
National symbols of Canada
Canada
Mounted police